Granville Straker (born September 12th, 1939) is a Saint Vincent-born American music businessman and record producer specializing in calypso music. He is known for his Brooklyn, New York-based record label Straker's Records, which he founded in 1971, as well as his production work for many of the artists signed to it. According to Mark Romano of AllMusic, Straker's Records "...defined major calypso and soca artists starting in the early '70s." Straker told record producer and researcher and Bill Nowlin that over a thirty year span his label released 600 to 700 albums, an excess of 1000 twelve inch records, and several thousand singles.

Biography
Straker first moved to Brooklyn from Trinidad in 1959. In 1971, he founded the calypso-centered record label Straker's Records. Around the same time, in response to the growing popularity of Caribbean music in Brooklyn, he set up several record stores in the area. Among the dozens of noteworthy calypsonians who released albums on Straker's Records were Shadow, Chalkdust, Calypso Rose, Lord Melody, Black Stalin, Mighty Duke, Explainer, and Lord Nelson. Straker was also active as a talent scout and concert promoter, and he frequently traveled to Trinidad to look for new calypso musicians. In 1978, fellow Vincentian Frankie McIntosh began working for Straker as his musical director. In this capacity, McIntosh wrote the musical arrangements for many of Straker's artists, and oversaw hundreds of recording sessions for calypsonians backed by the studio band the Equitables. As of 1999, he was still running his record store, Straker's Records & Stereo, from the same location in Brooklyn since it was founded twenty-seven years earlier.

References

1939 births
Living people
Saint Vincent and the Grenadines emigrants to the United States
Record producers from New York (state)
People from Brooklyn
American music industry executives